This is a list of political parties of minorities.